Salmas railway station (Persian:ايستگاه راه آهن سلماس, Istgah-e Rah Ahan-e Salmas) or also referred to as  Qareh Tappeh Railway Station ( – Īstgāh-e Rāh Āhan-e Qareh Tappeh) is a village and railway station in Koreh Soni Rural District, in the Central District of Salmas County, West Azerbaijan Province, Iran. At the 2006 census, its population was 119, in 26 families. The station is located 11 km north of Salmas, the city it is primarily intended to serve, 26 km south of Khoy, and 20 km southwest of Khoy Airport.  The station is owned by IRI Railway.

Service summary
Note: Classifications are unofficial and only to best reflect the type of service offered on each path
Meaning of Classifications:
Local Service: Services originating from a major city, and running outwards, with stops at all stations
Regional Service: Services connecting two major centres, with stops at almost all stations
InterRegio Service: Services connecting two major centres, with stops at major and some minor stations
InterRegio-Express Service:Services connecting two major centres, with stops at major stations
InterCity Service: Services connecting two (or more) major centres, with no stops in between, with the sole purpose of connecting said centres.

References

External links

Railway stations in Iran
Populated places in Salmas County